Hapıtlı (also, Gapytly and Khapytly) is a village and municipality in the Ismailli Rayon of Azerbaijan.  It has a population of 183.

References 

Populated places in Ismayilli District